John Hands is a British author who has been published in 9 countries. Trained as a scientist, he has written three novels, plus non-fiction books, most recently Cosmosapiens: Human Evolution from the Origin of the Universe, which spans scientific disciplines from cosmology to neuroscience, and Housing Co-operatives.

Biography

Hands was born near Rochdale in Lancashire, England and read Chemistry at Queen Mary College, University of London.  He was elected President of the University of London Union, the first undergraduate to occupy that post.  He worked in cooperatives, including as founding Director of the Government’s Co-operative Housing Agency, and served on three Government committees.

From 1987 to 1990 Hands tutored in Physics as well as Management Studies for the Open University, and contributed features to national newspapers while also writing novels.

In 2001 he was appointed Visiting Lecturer in Creative Writing at the University of North London, and in 2004 Royal Literary Fund Fellow at University College London (UCL), a post he held for five years.

Books

Cosmosapiens

Hands won an Arts Council England award to research and write Cosmosapiens: Human Evolution from the Origin of the Universe, published in the UK by Duckworth Overlook in 2015 and in the USA in 2016.  Foreign rights sold so far to Spain, Germany, China, Korea and Romania. The book constitutes a survey of current scientific knowledge of human evolution from the origin of the universe, in which Hands argues that commonly accepted theories including the Big Bang, Darwinism and the selfish gene are contradicted by twenty-first-century evidence; concluding that, uniquely, the human species, possesses self-reflective consciousness—and is still evolving, not physically or genetically but mentally.

The book was  selected by two reviewers in the Times Literary Supplement as a 2015 Book of the Year:  A.N. Wilson called it "an invaluable encyclopedic achievement " and Tim Crane described it as "Lucid and intelligible to non-specialists... a book of astonishing ambition and scope". Nicholas Blincoe listed it as one of the Best Science Books of 2015 in the Daily Telegraph, calling it "Shocking and invigorating ". It was also praised in The Observer.
London: Duckworth, 2015; New York: Overlook, 2016

Housing Co-operatives
The definitive book on housing co-operatives round the world, republished with a new Introduction for 2016. It is based on the learnings around the setup of Sanford Housing Co-operative, a pilote-scheme and the first purpose-build housing co-operative in the United Kingdom.

The Architects’ Journal said “John Hands’ timely and exemplary guide is marvellous...this is a book for all concerned with the role of and effects of housing in this society of ours”, while The Guardian commented “Shock, horror, drama. A new book is out about housing which says it's all about people and not about social engineering or investing for your old age...it's by John Hands who has actually succeeded in doing what he's talking about, which is to set up co-operative housing schemes that actually work.”  The Catholic Herald called it “a book for those who believe in the power of people to shape their own lives”

(London: SCD 1st edition 1975, Current edition )

Perestroika Christi
A thriller about the secret battle between the Kremlin and the Vatican for the soul of humankind, international best seller.

Norman Stone selected it as a Guardian Book of the Year, saying “I could not put it down. It is set in the crisscross world of the KGB and the Vatican, with scenes (extraordinarily prescient, it turns out) of Ukrainian nationalism: an elaborately crafted plot leads to a surprise outcome.”  George Bull in The Sunday Times called it a “fast moving first novel [that] explores the penultimate battle, fought with dastardly and Machiavellian brio...read this clever and vivid book.”, while Harriet Waugh in the Sunday Telegraph described it as “Genuinely scary, exciting, well plotted and nicely written.”
London: Simon & Schuster, 1990 [ASIN B017DGX9ZQ]

Darkness at Dawn
Prophetic espionage novel in which an amoral undercover agent is plunged into a crisis of loyalties when resurgent nationalism threatens war between Russia and Ukraine.

Michael Hartland in The Daily Telegraph said it “Hums with the realism of tomorrow’s headlines and the suspense is as sharp as a scalpel,” while Mary Dejevsky, wrote in The Independent that “The suspense is sustained to the very last page Vera Rich commented in The Tablet that “The author’s artistry means that the book succeeds not only at the adventure tale level—gripping as the plot line is—but more profoundly... A moving, remarkable book.”
London: HarperCollins, 1993

Brutal Fantasies
A CIA officer’s quest for a terrorist confronts him with the truths of his own past, forcing him to choose between his own redemption and the most precious thing in his life.

Peter Millar in The Times rated it “Excellent. A psychological thriller about the compromised soul of the secret agent... The character of John Darcy is as convincing as any I have encountered in espionage fiction...Hands builds and holds a palpable sense of tension that has all the drama and intimacy of good theatre. The achingly tantalizing crawl towards the climax is a masterpiece of suspense.” The Editorial Review on Amazon.com said “A top CIA agent, John Darcy, quickly brought to life with the kind of details that only an artist would include, is forced to take independent action when a ghost from his own past combines with an act of horrific destruction.” Jonathan Kemp in The Catholic Herald commented “This book is not merely a thriller. It is a novel of great profundity... One of the best novels I have read for a very long time. It deserves not only to become a best seller on its own merits, but also because it will promote greater understanding of the best and worst of humanity.”
London: HarperCollins, 1995 [ASIN B016XZY0BA]

References

External links
 John Hands author page www.johnhands.com
 Royal Literary Fund page for John Hands 
 A history of Sanford by co-founder John Hands 

Living people
British writers
1945 births